Acrossocheilus wuyiensis is a species of cyprinid fish in the genus Acrossocheilus. It is endemic to China, where it is found in Fujian.

References

Wuyiensis
Cyprinid fish of Asia
Freshwater fish of China
Endemic fauna of China
Fish described in 1981